The 2012 season for the  cycling team began in January at the Tour Down Under. As a UCI ProTeam, they were automatically invited and obligated to send a squad to every event in the UCI World Tour.

Johan Bruyneel along with twelve riders from the 2011  squad moved to the team, joining eighteen riders from the  squad.

Team roster
Ages as of 1 January 2012.

Riders who joined the team for the 2012 season

Riders who left the team during or after the 2011 season

Season victories

Footnotes

References

2012 road cycling season by team
Trek–Segafredo (men's team)
2012 in Luxembourgian sport
2012 in American sports